Åsmund Frægdegjevar is the first full-length album by the Norwegian folk metal band Lumsk. It was released on August 25, 2003 by Spinefarm. A concept album, it adapts the Norwegian legend Åsmund Frægdegjevar into an experimental folk metal project.

Track listing
 "Det var Irlands kongi bold" – 2:08	
 "Ormin lange" – 4:44	
 "Skip under lide" – 5:34	
 "I trollehender" – 3:11
 "Hår som spunnid gull" – 2:08	
 "Slepp meg" – 4:23	
 "Skomegyvri" – 6:24	
 "Olafs belti" – 4:45	
 "I lytinne två" – 3:54	
 "Langt nord i Trollebotten" – 3:33	
 "Fagran fljotan folen" – 7:23	
 "Kampen mot bergetrolli" – 4:07	
 "Der e ingin dag'e" – 6:06

References

2003 albums
Lumsk albums